Rosaria may refer to:

 Rosaria (album), a 1999 album by the London band Tiger
 Rosaria (given name)